The men's épée was one of seven fencing events on the fencing at the 1936 Summer Olympics programme. It was the ninth appearance of the event. The competition was held from 9 August 1936 to 11 August 1936. 68 fencers from 26 nations competed. Nations were limited to three fencers. The event was won by Franco Riccardi of Italy, the nation's second consecutive victory in the men's épée (matching Cuba and Belgium for second-most all-time among nations). Riccardi's teammates Saverio Ragno and Giancarlo Cornaggia-Medici took silver and bronze, respectively, to give Italy a medal sweep—Italy's first and the fourth overall in the event (Cuba in 1904, France in 1908 and 1920). Cornaggia-Medici, who had won gold in 1932, became the fourth man to win multiple medals in the individual épée. For the first time, France competed in the event but did not win any medals (snapping a four-Games podium streak).

Background
This was the ninth appearance of the event, which was not held at the first Games in 1896 (with only foil and sabre events held) but has been held at every Summer Olympics since 1900.

Three of the 12 finalists from the 1932 Games returned: gold medalist Giancarlo Cornaggia-Medici of Italy, fourth-place finisher Saverio Ragno of Italy, and tenth-place finisher Raúl Saucedo of Argentina. Hans Drakenberg of Sweden was the reigning (1935) World Champion as well as European champion; Pál Dunay of Hungary had been World Champion in 1934.

Brazil, Poland, and Yugoslavia each made their debut in the event. Belgium and the United States each appeared for the eighth time, tied for most among nations.

Competition format

The competition format was pool play round-robin, with bouts to three touches (unlike foil and sabre, but continuing the format from 1932). The format returned to four rounds. Not all bouts were played in some pools if not necessary to determine advancement. Two points were awarded for each bout won; if both fencers scored a hit simultaneously to make the bout 3–3, each received one point for the "null match". Ties were broken through fence-off bouts in early rounds if necessary for determining advancement, but by touches received in final rounds (and for non-advancement-necessary placement in earlier rounds).

 Round 1: 8 pools of between 7 and 10 fencers each. The top 5 fencers in each pool advanced to the quarterfinals.
 Quarterfinals: 4 pools of 10 fencers each. The top 5 fencers in each pool advanced to the semifinals. 
 Semifinals: 2 pools of 10 fencers each. The top 5 fencers in each pool advanced to the final.
 Final: 1 pool of 10 fencers.

Schedule

Results

Round 1

The top five finishers in each pool advanced to the quarterfinals.

Pool 1

De Beaumont is listed in 8th place and Schröder in 9th place in the official report, but Schröder had more points than de Beaumont.

Pool 2

Pool 3

Pool 4

Pool 5

Pool 6

Pool 7

In the three-way tie for fourth, Martínez came last to da Silveira and Guthe, with the latter two advancing.

Pool 8

In the three-way tie for fourth, Martínez came last to da Silveira and Guthe, with the latter two advancing.

Quarterfinals

The top five finishers in each pool advanced to the semifinals.

Quarterfinal 1

In the four-way tie for third place, Knutzen finished last in the play-off with Debeur, da Silveira, and Granfelt, with the latter three advancing.

Quarterfinal 2

Campbell-Gray defeated Miclescu-Prăjescu in a play-off bout to break to the tie for fifth and last advancement spot. The official report lists Weber 9th and Duret 8th, though the scoring system would put Weber in 8th with fewer touches received.

Quarterfinal 3

It is unclear why Villamil did not face Barraza, Driebergen did not face Leal, and Boulad did not face Bay. In general, bouts unnecessary to advancement were not played, but each of the three men eliminated in 6th through 8th place were within 2 points of the 5th-place finisher Zalokostas and could have caught him with an additional win (or even tie for Villamil), though Zalokostas himself had an unplayed bout against Hammer Sørensen and could have added to his point total.

Quarterfinal 4

Semifinals

The top five finishers in each pool advanced to the semifinals.

Semifinal 1

In the four-way tie for third place, Pécheux finished last in the play-off with Debeur, Zalokostas, and Cornaggia-Medici, with the latter three advancing.

Semifinal 2

In the four-way tie for fifth place, Drakenberg won the play-off pool against Kantor, Fitting, and Lerdon.

Final

The Italian fencers swept the medals. Ties in the final were broken by touches received, including Ragno taking silver to Cornaggia-Medici's bronze by a touches received score of 15–16 (Ragno had beaten Cornaggia-Medici head-to-head in the final after losing to him in the semifinal). Riccardi beat both of his countrymen in their bouts, ultimately taking gold with 1 point more than either despite winning 1 fewer bout due to his 3 ties.

References

Epee men
Men's events at the 1936 Summer Olympics